So Fine! is the fourth studio album by the Finnish avant-garde progressive metal band Waltari and their first collaboration with the Joik group Angelit.

Track listing

 "The Beginning Song" - 4:14
 "Mad Boy" - 4:23
 "So Fine" - 4:32
 "A Forest (The Cure cover)" - 5:25
 "4S" - 5:42
 "Celtic Funk" - 3:23
 "Your Nature Is Wild" - 6:12 
 "To Give" - 4:29
 "Piggy In The Middle" - 2:53
 "Freddie Laker" - 3:08
 "Autumn" - 3:45
 "Rhythm is a Cancer" - 3:07
 "Misty Man" - 4:17
 "Mysterious" - 14:59

Credits

Kärtsy Hatakka - Vocals, Bass, Keyboards
Jariot Lehtinen - Guitar
Sami Yli-Sirniö - Guitar
Janne Parviainen - Drums

External links
Encyclopaedia Metallum page

Waltari albums
1994 albums